Paul J. Smith (March 15, 1906 – November 17, 1980) was an American animator and director.

Biography
Smith began as a cel painter for Walt Disney Animation in August 1926, then moved up to an animator when he remembered he did not work behind a curtain, but a back room. On May 5, 1928, when all the Oswald the Lucky Rabbit cartoons for Charles Mintz were completed, Smith left the payroll.

Smith worked for the Walter Lantz studio for much of his career, first starting as an animator, and then as a director. He also animated at Warner Bros. Cartoons.

By 1955, Smith had taken over as primary director of the Woody Woodpecker cartoon shorts, with periodic fill-in shorts directed by peers Alex Lovy, Jack Hannah, and Sid Marcus. With Smith in the director's chair, the Woody Woodpecker series maintained its trademark frenetic energy, while the animation itself was simplified, due to budget constraints. By the late 1960s, Smith became the sole director of the Lantz studio's output: the cartoon series Woody Woodpecker, Chilly Willy, and The Beary Family. Smith stayed with Lantz until the studio was closed in 1972.

Smith died in Van Nuys, California on November 17, 1980. He was the brother of animators Frank Smith and Hank Smith and the uncle of actor and film director Charles Martin Smith.

References

External links

A Paul J. Smith Scrapbook

1906 births
1980 deaths
American animators
American animated film directors
Warner Bros. Cartoons people
Walter Lantz Productions people
Walt Disney Animation Studios people